Symptom refers to a medical indication of an illness.

Symptoms may also refer to:
 Symptoms (film), 1974 horror film
 Symptoms (Useless ID album), 2012
 Symptoms (Ashley Tisdale album), 2019
Symptoms (song), a 2013 song by Shinee
"Symptoms", a song by Atlas Genius from the 2013 album When It Was Now
"Symptoms", a song by Alanis Morissette from the 2002 album Hands Clean

See also 
 Symptomatic (disambiguation)